Aworowa is a town in the Bono East Region of Ghana. The town is known for the Aworowa Secondary Technical School.  The school is a second cycle institution.

References

Populated places in the Bono East Region